Bulls, Love and Glory (Spanish: "Toros, amor y gloria") is a 1943 Mexican film. It stars Sara García.

External links
 

1943 films
1940s Spanish-language films
Mexican black-and-white films
Mexican drama films
1943 drama films
1940s Mexican films